Dark River or The Dark River may refer to:

Geography
 Dark River (Minnesota), a river in Minnesota, U.S.
 Dark River, Minnesota, an unorganized territory in Minnesota, U.S.
 Dark River, New Zealand, a river in New Zealand

Art and entertainment
 Dark River (1952 film) (Las aguas bajan turbias), an Argentine drama
 Dark River (1990 film), a British TV drama
 Dark River (2017 film), a British drama
 Dark River, a 2007 novel in the Warriors: Power of Three series by Erin Hunter
 The Dark River (novel), a novel by John Twelve Hawks
 The Dark River, a 1943 play by Rodney Ackland
 The Dark River, an album by Vond, a side project of Mortiis
 "Dark River", a song by Coil from Love's Secret Domain

Other
 Dark River (astronomy) or Great Rift, a series of dust clouds that divides the bright band of the Milky Way lengthwise

See also 
 List of river name etymologies, for other rivers whose name means "dark river"